The Men's double FITA round team integrated was an archery competition at the 1984 Summer Paralympics.

The Swedish team won the gold medal.

Results

References

1984 Summer Paralympics events